"The God in the Bowl" is one of the original short stories featuring the sword and sorcery hero Conan the Cimmerian, written by American author Robert E. Howard but not published during his lifetime. Set during the fictional Hyborian Age, the plot sees Conan robbing a temple museum only to become the prime suspect in a murder mystery. The story first saw publication in September 1952 in Space Science Fiction and has been reprinted many times since.

Plot summary

In the Nemedian municipality of Numalia, the second largest city of Nemedia, Conan enters a museum and antique house called the Temple of Kallian Publico.

While robbing the museum, Conan becomes embroiled in a murder investigation. The strangled corpse of the temple's owner and curator, Kallian Publico, is found by a night watchman. Though the Cimmerian is the prime suspect, the investigating magistrate, Demetrio, and the prefect of police, Dionus, show forbearance. The two allow Conan to remain free and keep his unsheathed sword while their men search the premises. A combination of Conan's physique, his glare, and his insistence that he'll disembowel the first person who tried to apprehend him keeps the guards at bay.

As his investigation unfolds, the magistrate learns from Promero, Publico's clerk, that Publico had received from Stygia a bowl-like sarcophagus which now lies unsealed, open, and empty. This sarcophagus is a priceless relic found among the tombs beneath the Stygian pyramids and sent to Caranthes of Hanumar, Priest of Ibis, "because of the love which the sender bore the priest of Ibis". Intercepting this item meant for Caranthes, Publico believes the sarcophagus contains the diadem of the giant-kings. But the object held something more insidious.

While the magistrate and his men are baffled when uncovering this information, it turns out the murderer may have been non-human and was contained within the now-opened sarcophagus. A scream forces the police to retreat, leaving Conan to fend for himself with the roaming murderer. Conan locates the culprit, a giant serpent that he dispatches with his long sword.

Editing controversy
The original version was rejected by pulp magazine Weird Tales in Howard's lifetime and only rediscovered in 1951. It was then edited by L. Sprague de Camp for publication, and this edited version was the first version to see print. Several other differently-edited versions followed. The unedited, original version was only printed in 2002 with Conan of Cimmeria: Volume One (1932-1933).

Many of de Camp's edits were slight. They have been characterized as technically correct and more precise but at the expense of losing some of the richness and energy of Howard's original. 

Here is an example of the differences in texts. The first is by Howard, the second by de Camp:

Purists decry De Camp's editorial work on both this and other Howard Conan stories. He reportedly substantially altered and rewrote whole sections, often to include references to his own work.

Everett F. Bleiler, commenting on the edited text, described "The God in the Bowl" as "a primitive detective story" and found it to be "not very good". 

Carson Ward commented further: "A more fitting term would be an anti detective story-  since it turns upside down the basic conventions of the genre. It begins in normal detective story fashion - a murder is discovered, the police arrives, a rationalist detective (Dionus) starts a thorough investigation, discards red herrings, and looks for the real culprit. But in total opposition to the conventional ending of a detective story - i.e, the detective solving the mystery and triumphantly apprehending the culprit -  'God in Bowl' ends with the forces of law and order totally routed, detective and constables fleeing the scene in panic. The stage is left to the clash of primeval forces, the barbarian from the north against the sinister magic from the south. The outcome is entirely due to Conan's sword-arm. The laws and criminal procedures of the surrounding city and kingdom are effectively nullified." (Ward probably meant Demetrio, not Dionus, given the roles played by both characters in the story. Demetrio plays the more rational and evidence-oriented authority.)

Reprint history
Reprints of this story have appeared in the collections The Coming of Conan (Gnome Press, 1953) and Conan (Lancer Books, 1967). It has most recently been republished in the collections The Conan Chronicles Volume 1: The People of the Black Circle (Gollancz, 2000) and Conan of Cimmeria: Volume One (1932-1933) (Del Rey, 2003). Recent versions remove all L. Sprague de Camp's alterations.

Ibis

The story introduces the god Ibis and his priest, Caranthes of Hanumar, but little is told of them besides the fact that somebody in sinister Stygia disliked the priest enough to spend considerable effort to try to kill him. Howard never made much more of Ibis in the rest of the canonical Conan stories, leaving him an obscure feature of the Hyborian age. Some writers of future Conan stories give Ibis a more prominent role. In particular, the plot of Sean A. Moore's Conan and the Grim Grey God takes up in detail thousands of years' of the history of Ibis and his priesthood, and their hereditary conflict with the Stygian priests and gods.

Adaptations
Roy Thomas and Barry Smith adapt the story in Marvel Comics' Conan the Barbarian #7 ("The Lurker Within", July 1971). Some alterations from the original text are made, including that Aztrias, the aristocrat who hires and betrays Conan, is a woman and is killed by the serpent rather than by Conan. Kurt Busiek and Cary Nord also adapt the story in Dark Horse Comics' Conan #10 & 11.

References

External links
 Conan the Barbarian at AmratheLion.com
 Conan.com: The Official Website
 The Mystery of Pre-Human Stygia • Essay pertaining to the Giant-Kings by Dale Rippke

1952 short stories
Conan the Barbarian stories by Robert E. Howard
Fantasy short stories
Cthulhu Mythos short stories
Mystery short stories
Pulp stories
Works originally published in Space Science Fiction
Short stories published posthumously